Ainaa Amani (born 18 March 2002 in Kuala Lumpur) is a Malaysian professional squash player. As of March 2023, she was ranked number 93 in the world. She won the 2023 HK Squash Challenge Cup.

References

2002 births
Living people
Malaysian female squash players